Eurydemus ben Jose was one of the sons of Tanna Jose ben Ḥalafta. The few remarks ascribed to Eurydemus contain admonitions to benevolence.

Notes

References
 

2nd-century rabbis
Mishnah rabbis